Arif Mahmood or Mehmood may refer to:

Arif Mehmood (born 1983), Pakistani footballer
Arif Mehmood Alam (1965-2011) Pakistan Army Officer form Chakwal Punjab Pakistan

See also
Asif Mahmood, Pakistani cricketer
Arif Mahmood Gill, Pakistani politician from Punjab